Stuart O'Brien (27 May 1906 – 10 January 2004) was an American film editor.  He worked on B-movies, primarily low budget horror and exploitation films. Some notable examples are Roger Corman's The Terror (1963) and Francis Ford Coppola's Dementia 13 (1963).

External links
 

1906 births
2004 deaths
American film editors